Mathieu Montcourt cannot defend his title. He died on 6 July 2009.
Thiemo de Bakker became the new champion, after defeating Peter Luczak 6–4, 7–6(7) in the final.

Seeds

Draw

Final four

Top half

Bottom half

References
 Main Draw
 Qualifying Draw

Tampere Open - Singles
Tampere Open